Marcel Zeller (3 August 1973 – 25 November 2016) was a German professional boxer.

Zeller was found dead in his apartment, from a suspected drug overdose on 25 November 2016.

References

External links

1973 births
German male boxers
Sportspeople from Karlsruhe
2016 deaths
Heavyweight boxers
Drug-related deaths in Germany